Attorney General Uniacke may refer to:

James Boyle Uniacke (1799–1858), Attorney General of Nova Scotia
Richard John Uniacke (1753–1830), Attorney General of Nova Scotia
Richard John Uniacke Jr. (1789–1834), Attorney General of the Colony of Cape Breton Island